Anthony Spinelli (February 21, 1927 – May 29, 2000) was an American one-time mainstream actor and producer, who later became a pornographic film director.

Under his original stage name, Sam Weston, he produced the mainstream films Gun Fever (1958) and One Potato, Two Potato (1964). As an actor, he appeared on several TV shows in the 1960s, including Alfred Hitchcock Presents, Green Acres, and That Girl. After those films, he was unable to find further work in mainstream entertainment, and became an encyclopedia salesman to support his family. After seeing a pornographic film in an adult theater, he decided to move into that genre of film starting with Diary of a Nymph (1971).

Among his most famous adult movies was Nothing to Hide, which has been ranked number two on AVN magazine's list of all-time greatest adult movies. He is the brother of actor Jack Weston and the father of porn director Mitchell Spinelli.

Filmography

Awards
 1985 AVN Award – Best Director, Film (Dixie Ray, Hollywood Star)
 1993 AVN Award – Best Director, Video (The Party)
 XRCO Hall of Fame inductee
 AVN Hall of Fame inductee

References

External links
 
 
 

1927 births
2000 deaths
American pornographic film directors
American film producers
20th-century American Jews
Artists from Cleveland
20th-century American businesspeople